The vice president of Laos is the political position in Laos created in 1996. The Vice President is elected by the National Assembly of Laos.

The history of the office holders follows.

See also
President of Laos
List of current vice presidents

References

Politics of Laos
Laos
 
1996 establishments in Laos